This is the discography of British jazz and soul band Carmel.

Albums

Studio albums

Live albums

Compilation albums

Video albums

Singles

References

Discographies of British artists
Pop music group discographies
Jazz discographies
Soul music discographies